This Is Where I Came In is the twenty-second and final studio album by the pop group the Bee Gees. It was released on 24 April 2001 by Polydor in the UK and Universal in the US, less than two years before Maurice Gibb died from a cardiac arrest before surgery to repair a twisted intestine.

It is the only album of all-new material released by them on the Universal Music label (which had acquired the rights to the group's releases on Polydor Records when they bought that label's parent PolyGram). The album peaked at No. 6 in the UK, while the single, "This Is Where I Came In", reached No. 18. In the US, the album peaked at No. 16. The group appeared on the A&E concert series Live by Request in April 2001 to promote the new album.

The brothers saw the album as a return to the original Bee Gees formula as well as a new beginning. The album marked the fifth decade of recording for the band. It was one of the first Bee Gees albums to be re-released on Reprise Records in 2006, when the brothers regained the rights to all of their recordings.

Background
The album features main vocals from all three of the brothers, and employs a variety of musical styles. "This Is Where I Came In" recalls the rock theme more commonly found on 1960s Bee Gees songs. "She Keeps on Coming" and "Voice in the Wilderness" have strong rock themes, while "Sacred Trust", "Just in Case" and "Wedding Day" continue the Bee Gees' trend for love songs. Maurice plays the Epiphone guitar gifted to him by John Lennon on She Keeps On Coming Two of Robin's songs, "Embrace" and "Promise The Earth" are Europop dance songs, while Barry's "Technicolor Dreams" is an exception to the rule, as it is an homage to the typical 1930s Tin Pan Alley melody. Maurice Gibb provides lead vocals for two songs, "Man in the Middle" and "Walking on Air". In the United Kingdom, two bonus tracks were published, "Just in Case" and "Promise the Earth" as well as other countries issued the album with 14 tracks.

Recording
One song in the album, "Sacred Trust" was recorded in early 1998 in Miami Beach. Around 1999, the Bee Gees recorded "I Will Be There" but only as a demo as they sent it to Tina Turner and she recorded it for her album Twenty Four Seven that same year. Maurice Gibb was busy producing songs for the band Luna Park. Also in 1999, three new Barry Gibb compositions "Technicolor Dreams", "Loose Talk Costs Lives" and "Voice in the Wilderness" were recorded as well as four new Maurice Gibb compositions, but only "Walking on Air" and "Man in the Middle" were released. Also in 1999, the new Robin Gibb composition, "Embrace" was recorded. In October that year, the group recorded "Wedding Day". The next year 2000, the group recorded five more songs including the title track, "This Is Where I Came In".

Track listing
All songs written by Barry, Robin and Maurice Gibb, except where noted.

Personnel
Bee Gees
Barry Gibb – vocals, guitar, production
Robin Gibb – vocals, production
Maurice Gibb – vocals, keyboards, synthesizer, guitar, programming, production

Additional personnel

Alan Kendall – lead guitar
Matt Bonelli – bass guitar on 4, 7 & 12, additional bass on 9
George "Chocolate" Perry – bass guitar (tracks 1–3, 9, 11 & 13)
Ben Stivers – keyboards, piano on track 7, organ on track 10
Steve Rucker – drums
Peter-John Vettese – programming, backing vocals, production on tracks 6, 10 and 14
Robbie McIntosh – guitar on track 6
Neil Bonsanti – clarinet on track 7
Joe Barati – trombone
Tim Barnes – viola
Jason Carder – trumpet
Hui Fang Chen – violin
David Cole – cello
Gustavo Correa – violin
Dwayne Dixon – French horn
Orlando Forte – violin
Ken Faulk – trumpet
Chris Glansdorp – cello
Jim Hacker – piccolo trumpet
Jon Hutchinson – trombone
Eric Kerley – French horn
John Knicker – trombone
Mel Mei Luo – violin
Cheryl Naberhaus – French horn
Alfredo Olivia – violin, concert master
Chauncey Patterson – viola
Mariusz Wojtowics – violin

Charts

Weekly charts

Year-end charts

Certifications

References

Bee Gees albums
2001 albums
Pop rock albums
Polydor Records albums
Universal Records albums
Albums produced by Barry Gibb
Albums produced by Robin Gibb
Albums produced by Maurice Gibb